Baseball at the 1963 Pan American Games was contested between teams representing Brazil, Cuba, Mexico, United States, and Venezuela. The 1963 edition was the fourth Pan American Games, and was hosted by São Paulo.

Medal summary

Medal table

Medalists

References

 

1963
Events at the 1963 Pan American Games
Pan American Games
1963 Pan American Games